Francisco Domonte, O. de M. (1618–1681) was a Roman Catholic prelate who served as Auxiliary Bishop of Seville (1680–1681).

Biography
Francisco Domonte was born in Seville, Spain and ordained a priest in the Order of the Blessed Virgin Mary of Mercy. On 11 Mar 1680, he was appointed during the papacy of Pope Innocent XI as Auxiliary Bishop of Seville and Titular Bishop of Hippos. On 2 Jun 1680, he was consecrated bishop by Ambrosio Ignacio Spínola y Guzmán, Archbishop of Seville with James Lynch, Archbishop of Tuam, serving as co-consecrator. He served as Auxiliary Bishop of Seville until his death in 1681.

While bishop, he was the principal co-consecrator of Antonio de Vergara, Archbishop of Sassari (1680) and Juan Grande Santos de San Pedro, Bishop of Almeria (1681).

See also 
Catholic Church in Spain

References

External links and additional sources
 (for Chronology of Bishops) 
 (for Chronology of Bishops) 
 (for Chronology of Bishops) 
 (for Chronology of Bishops) 

1618 births
1681 deaths
17th-century Roman Catholic bishops in Spain
Bishops appointed by Pope Innocent XI
Mercedarian bishops
People from Seville